Kołaczkowo  is a village in the administrative district of Gmina Witkowo, within Gniezno County, Greater Poland Voivodeship, in west-central Poland.

During the German occupation (World War II), in December 1939, the Germans expelled many Polish families from Kołaczkowo to the so-called General Government, and their houses were handed over to German colonists as part of the Heim ins Reich policy.

There is a historic manor house in Kołaczkowo with an adjacent park and an old distillery.

References

Villages in Gniezno County